Calvin Bernard Smith (born September 4, 1941) is an American former professional baseball player. He was a backup outfielder in Major League Baseball who played from  through  for the Milwaukee Brewers of the American League. He was born in Ponchatoula, Louisiana, and attended Southern University.

Smith played eight seasons (1962–1969) of minor league baseball in the New York Mets' organization before a 1969–1970 offseason trade afforded him an opportunity with the 1970 Brewers. In a two-season MLB career, Smith was a .232 hitter (26-for-112) with two home runs and nine RBI in 59 games, including four doubles, one triple, one stolen base, and a .317 on-base percentage.

See also
1970 Milwaukee Brewers season
1971 Milwaukee Brewers season
Milwaukee Brewers all-time roster

External links
Baseball Reference
Retrosheet

Milwaukee Brewers players
Raleigh Mets players
Auburn Mets players
Williamsport Mets players
Portland Beavers players
Evansville Triplets players
Tidewater Tides players
Buffalo Bisons (minor league) players
Jacksonville Suns players
Columbus Jets players
Major League Baseball outfielders
Southern University alumni
Baseball players from Louisiana
1941 births
Living people
People from Ponchatoula, Louisiana